The 1960 United States Senate election in North Carolina was held on November 8, 1960. Incumbent Democratic Senator B. Everett Jordan was re-elected to a full term in office, defeating Republican Wilkes County attorney R. Kyle Hayes. 

The simultaneous victories of Jordan, gubernatorial nominee Terry Sanford and presidential nominee John F. Kennedy marked the last time Democrats won all three top contests in North Carolina on the same day until 2008.

Democratic primary

Candidates
Robert Gregory
Addison Hewlett, Speaker of the North Carolina House of Representatives
B. Everett Jordan, incumbent U.S. Senator since 1958
Robert M. McIntosh

Results

General election

Results

References

1960
North Carolina
1960 North Carolina elections